Eduard Schöll (15 July 1904 – 1989) was an Austrian wrestler. He competed in the men's Greco-Roman heavyweight at the 1936 Summer Olympics.

References

External links
 

1904 births
1989 deaths
Austrian male sport wrestlers
Olympic wrestlers of Austria
Wrestlers at the 1936 Summer Olympics
Place of birth missing